E.G. is an Australian only release EP from New Zealand four piece Goodshirt.

Release Information
Australia: November 2002 - (Cement/Shock)

Track listing
"Place To Be" – 3:26
"Blowing Dirt" – 4:06
"Not That Far" – 2:50
"Mixing It Up" – 2:53
"Melobeeda" – 3:34
"Fall" – 2:38

Goodshirt albums
2002 EPs